Postal police are generally law enforcement agencies with responsibility for policing the postal or telecommunications systems of various countries.

United States
United States Postal Inspection Service
Germany
Postschutz
Italy
Polizia postale e delle comunicazioni

References

 
Law enforcement units
Postal organizations